Marco Rangl (born 7 May 1990) is an Austrian bobsledder. He competed in the four-man event at the 2018 Winter Olympics.

References

External links
 

1990 births
Living people
Austrian male bobsledders
Olympic bobsledders of Austria
Bobsledders at the 2018 Winter Olympics
People from Eisenstadt
Sportspeople from Burgenland
21st-century Austrian people